Jewish–Arab Brotherhood (Ahva Yehudit-Aravit) was a short-lived, one-man political party in Israel.

Background
The party was formed on 22 October 1968, during the sixth Knesset, when Elias Nakhleh broke away from Progress and Development.

For the 1969 elections, Nakhleh merged the party into Cooperation and Brotherhood, effectively swapping parties with Jabr Muadi, who had begun the session as a member of Cooperation and Brotherhood, then left to set up the Israeli Druze Faction, before joining Progress and Development.

References

External links
Jewish-Arab Brotherhood Knesset website

Arab political parties in Israel
Defunct political parties in Israel
Political parties established in 1968

1969 disestablishments in Israel
Political parties disestablished in 1969